The 1957 Pan Arab Games football tournament was the 2nd edition of the Pan Arab Games men's football tournament. The football tournament was held in Beirut, Lebanon between 19–27 October 1957 as part of the 1957 Pan Arab Games.

Participating teams
The following countries have participated for the final tournament:

Squads

Group stage

Group A

Group B

Knockout stage

Semifinals

Third place match

Final

Final ranking

External links
2nd Pan Arab Games, 1957 (Beirut, Lebanon) - rsssf.com

1957 Pan Arab Games
1957
Pan
Pan
1957